Michelan Sisti (born May 27, 1949) is an Puerto Rican-born American actor, puppeteer, director and musician who played Michelangelo in Teenage Mutant Ninja Turtles and its sequel Teenage Mutant Ninja Turtles II: The Secret of the Ooze. He previously had an eighteen-year theatrical career including three Broadway shows: Motel the tailor in the 1981 revival of Fiddler on the Roof, Panda in Raggedy Ann (1986), and Bobby and understudy for the Emcee in the 1987 Cabaret revival. While understudying Joel Grey in the pre-Broadway tour of Cabaret,  Grey lost his voice, and Sisti sang and spoke off-stage while Grey pretended to sing.

Since TMNT, Sisti moved from New York City to Los Angeles and has continued to work with The Jim Henson Company, Walt Disney Studios, and many other movie and television productions. From September 8–10, 2017, he was an additional Muppet performer for a live show at the Hollywood Bowl titled The Muppets Take the Bowl and again, in London, for The Muppets Take the O2 show from July 13–14, 2018.

References

 Wloszczyna, Susan. "Putting the moves in the 'Ninja Turtles' movie; Michaelangelo steps out of his shell". USA Today, April 10, 1990, p. D7

External links

Michelan Sisti at Internet Broadway Database

1949 births
Living people
American male stage actors
American male film actors
American puppeteers
Muppet performers